A Marked Man is a 1917 American silent Western film directed by John Ford and featuring Harry Carey. It is considered to be a lost film.

Plot
As described in a film magazine, Cheyenne Harry (Carey), in his search for food, breaks into the home of Grant Young (Rattenberry) and his daughter Molly (Malone), who recognizes him as the man who held up the train she was traveling on but then allowed her to keep a brooch, a gift from her mother. Grant gives him a chance to make good by becoming an employee on the ranch. Harry enters a horse race contest to get enough money to visit his mother, but Ben Kent, a road agent and an old friend of Harry, cuts his stirrups. Grant forces Harry to assist in holding up a stage coach, and after Kent kills the driver of the coach, both he and Harry are arrested. A message announcing the pending arrival of Harry's mother (Townsend) results in the postponement of Harry's hanging for a couple of weeks, and Harry is allowed by the sheriff (Steele) to make use of Grant's ranch and daughter to deceive Harry's mother, as Harry had stated in his letters to her that he was an honorable man. After his mother's departure, a telegram arrives that exonerates Harry, and he rushes to see Molly.

Cast
 Harry Carey as Cheyenne Harry
 Molly Malone as Molly Young
 Harry L. Rattenberry as Grant Young (credited as Harry Rattenbury)
 Vester Pegg as Ben Kent
 Anna Townsend as Harry's Mother (credited as Mrs. Townsend)
 William Steele as Sheriff (credited as Bill Gettinger)
 Hoot Gibson as Undetermined role

Reception
Like many American films of the time, A Marked Man was subject to cuts by city and state film censorship boards. The Chicago Board of Censors required cuts of four scenes of holdup of coach in pass, first holdup scene in water, and the intertitle "Clear out of here and we will forget about the hold up".

See also
 Harry Carey filmography
 Hoot Gibson filmography
 List of lost films

References

External links

 
 Synopsis at Turner Classic Movies

1917 films
1917 lost films
1917 Western (genre) films
American black-and-white films
Films directed by John Ford
Lost Western (genre) films
Lost American films
Silent American Western (genre) films
Universal Pictures films
1910s American films